The following is a list of the 267 communes of the Loir-et-Cher department of France.

The communes cooperate in the following intercommunalities (as of 2020):
Communauté d'agglomération de Blois Agglopolys
Communauté d'agglomération Territoires Vendômois
Communauté de communes Beauce Val de Loire
Communauté de communes Cœur de Sologne
Communauté de communes des Collines du Perche
Communauté de communes du Grand Chambord
Communauté de communes du Perche et Haut Vendômois
Communauté de communes du Romorantinais et du Monestois
Communauté de communes de la Sologne des Étangs
Communauté de communes de la Sologne des Rivières
Communauté de communes des Terres du Val de Loire (partly)
Communauté de communes Val-de-Cher-Controis

References

Loir-et-Cher